Richard Edmund St Lawrence Boyle, 9th Earl of Cork and 9th Earl of Orrery KP, PC (19 April 1829 – 22 June 1904), styled Viscount Dungarvan between 1834 and 1856, was a British courtier and Liberal politician. In a ministerial career spanning between 1866 and 1895, he served three times as Master of the Buckhounds and twice as Master of the Horse.

Background and education
Boyle was born in Dublin, Ireland, the eldest son of Charles Boyle, Viscount Dungarvan, by his wife Lady Catherine St Lawrence, daughter of William St Lawrence, 2nd Earl of Howth. He was the grandson of Edmund Boyle, 8th Earl of Cork. He was educated at Eton and Christ Church, Oxford. He became known by the courtesy title Viscount Dungarvan on the early death of his father in 1834. He was a member of Brooks's and White's clubs. On 20 July 1850, he was commissioned a captain in the North Somerset Yeomanry.

Political career
Lord Dungarvan was elected Member of Parliament for Frome at a by-election in 1854, a seat he held until 1856, when he succeeded his grandfather in the earldom and entered the House of Lords. In 1860 he was made a Knight of the Order of St Patrick. He became a government member in January 1866, when he was appointed Master of the Buckhounds under Lord Russell, a post he held until the administration fell in July 1866. He was sworn of the Privy Council in May of that year. He was once again Master of the Buckhounds under William Ewart Gladstone between 1868 and 1874 and between 1880 and 1885. In 1882 he was appointed one of the speakers of the House of Lords. When Gladstone became prime minister for the third time in February 1886, Cork was appointed Master of the Horse. However, the government fell in July of the same year. He did not serve in Gladstone's fourth administration of 1892 to 1894, but when Lord Rosebery succeeded as prime minister in March 1894, Cork was once again appointed Master of the Horse. The Liberal government fell in June the following year.

Lord Cork was also Lord Lieutenant of Somerset from 1864 to 1904, an Aide-de-Camp to Queen Victoria from 1889 to 1899 and a Colonel of the North Somerset Yeomanry.

Estates
According to John Bateman, who derived his information from statistics published in 1873, Lord Cork, of Marston House, Frome, had 3,398 acres in Somerset (worth 5,094 guineas per annum), 20,195 acres in County Cork (worth 6,943 guineas per annum), 11,531 acres in County Kerry (worth 2,447 guineas per annum), and 3,189 acres in Limerick (worth 2,859 guineas per annum).

Family
Lord Cork married Lady Emily Charlotte de Burgh (19 October 1828 – 10 October 1912), second daughter of Ulick de Burgh, 1st Marquess of Clanricarde, on 20 July 1853. They had seven children:

Lady Emily Harriet Catherine Boyle (c. 1855 – 28 July 1931), married James Dalison Alexander, and had issue.
Lady Grace Elizabeth Boyle (c. 1858 – 23 May 1935), married the Honourable Henry Francis Baring, and had issue.
Lady Honora Janet Boyle (c. 1859 – 11 March 1953), married Robert Kirkman Hodgson DL, with issue.
Lady Isabel Lettice Theodosia Boyle (d. 6 April 1904), married James Walker Larnach, and had issue.
Lady Dorothy Blanche Boyle (c. 1860 – 7 June 1938), married Walter Long, 1st Viscount Long, and had issue.
Charles Spencer Boyle, 10th Earl of Cork (1861–1925), married Mrs Rosalie Gray, née de Villiers, and had no issue.
Robert John Lascelles Boyle, 11th Earl of Cork (1864–1934), married Josephine Hale, of San Francisco, and had no issue.

Lord Cork died at Berkeley Square, Mayfair, London, in June 1904, aged 75, and was succeeded in the earldom by his eldest son, Charles. The Countess of Cork died in October 1912, aged 83.

References

External links 
 

1829 births
1904 deaths
Alumni of Christ Church, Oxford
Knights of St Patrick
Lord-Lieutenants of Somerset
Members of the Privy Council of the United Kingdom
Dungarvan, Richard Boyle, Viscount
Dungarvan, Richard Boyle, Viscount
UK MPs who inherited peerages
Richard
North Somerset Yeomanry officers
Deputy Lieutenants of Somerset
Masters of the Buckhounds
People educated at Eton College
9th
9th
6th